is a Japanese voice actor.

Filmography

Television animation
 Detective Conan (1997) (Tequila, Nagato Hideomi)
 Neo Ranga (1998) (Samuel)
 Cowboy Bebop (1999) (Udai Taxim)
 Turn A Gundam (1999) (Quoatl)
 The Legend of Condor Hero (2001) (Narration)
 Beyblade V-Force (2002) (Zagard)
 Full Metal Panic! (2002) (Master Sailor)
 Heat Guy J (2002) (Valtat Jurgens)
 Kiddy Grade (2002) (Admiral)
 Bleach (2005) (Onabara Gengoro)
 Naruto (2005) (Gosunkugi)
 Digimon Savers (2006) (Merukimon)
 Musashi Gundoh (2006) (Dabi-no-ji)
 Higurashi When They Cry (2006) (Mion's Father)
 Dinosaur King (2008) (Blackbeard)
 Golgo 13 (2008) (Whitney)
 Michiko & Hatchin (2008) (City Official)
 Spice and Wolf II (2009) (Arnold)
 Gon (2012) (Kai)
 One Piece (2012) (Shuzo)
 Beast Saga (2013) (Al Dile)
 Kill la Kill (2013) (Takiji Kuroido)
 Captain Earth (2014) (Jack)
 One Piece (2014) (Hack)
 Assassination Classroom (2016) (Principal Matsukata)
 Brave Witches (2016) (Klaus Mannerheim) (ep. 4, 11-12)
 Princess Principal (2017) (Danny MacBean "Dorothy's father", Beatrice (Imitation Voice (other by Fukushi Ochiai, Motomu Kiyokawa, Tessho Genda, Hiroya Ishimaru) "Danny MacBean"))) (ep. 6)
 Hakata Tonkotsu Ramens (2018) (Genzō Gohda)
 Night Head 2041 (2021) (Losyukov)

Animated films
 Redline (2009) (Roboworld President)
 King of Thorn (2010) (The Senator/Alexandro Pecchino)
 Crayon Shin-chan: Burst Serving! Kung Fu Boys ~Ramen Rebellion~ (2018)

Video games
Crash Nitro Kart (2003) (Krunk)
Halo (2007) (Sergeant Johnson)
Devil May Cry 4: Special Edition (2015) (Bael & Dagon)

Unknown date
Bravely Default (Hayreddin Barbarossa)
Bravely Second (Hayreddin Barbarossa)
Gears of War (Marcus Fenix)
Soulcalibur: Broken Destiny (Nightmare)
Soulcalibur Legends (Nightmare)
Soulcalibur IV (Nightmare)

Tokusatsu
 Megaloman (1979)  (ep. 28)
 Kaizoku Sentai Gokaiger (2011) (Bongan) (ep. 2)
 Thermae Romae II (2014) (Romani)

Dubbing roles

Live-action
Danny Trejo
Point Blank (Wallace)
Bubble Boy (Slim)
Spy Kids (Isador "Machete" Cortez)
Spy Kids 2: The Island of Lost Dreams (Isador "Machete" Cortez)
Spy Kids 3-D: Game Over (Isador "Machete" Cortez)
Urban Justice (El Chivo)
Breaking Bad (Tortuga)
Bones (Bishop)
Death Race 2 (Goldberg)
Machete (Machete Cortez)
Predators (Cuchillo)
Recoil (Drake Salgado)
Bad Ass (Frank Vega)
Death Race 3: Inferno (Goldberg)
Dead in Tombstone (Guerrero De La Cruz)
Machete Kills (Machete Cortez)
Bad Asses (Frank Vega)
In the Blood (Big Biz)
3-Headed Shark Attack (Mike Burns)
Dora and the Lost City of Gold (Boots)
The SpongeBob Movie: Sponge on the Run (El Diablo)
The 13th Warrior (Helfdane (Clive Russell))
15 Minutes (Det. Leon Jackson (Avery Brooks))
Alice in Wonderland (Bayard Hamar the Bloodhound (Timothy Spall))
Alice Through the Looking Glass (Bayard Hamar the Bloodhound (Timothy Spall))
Asteroid (1997 TV Asahi edition) (General Symons)
The Big Hit (Paris (Avery Brooks))
Black Book (Günther Franken (Waldemar Kobus))
Bunraku (Nicola "The Woodcutter" (Ron Perlman))
The Butterfly Effect 3: Revelations (Harry Goldburg)
Charade (2004 DVD edition) (Tex Panthollow (James Coburn))
A Civil Action (John Riley (Dan Hedaya))
Daddy Day Camp (Colonel Buck Hinton (Richard Gant))
A Dog of Flanders (William the Blacksmith (Bruce McGill))
Don't Look Up (Benedict Drask (Ron Perlman))
Drive (Nino 'Izzy' Paolozzi (Ron Perlman))
The Fifth Element (General Munro (Brion James))
Ford v Ferrari (Henry Ford II (Tracy Letts))
Gangster Squad (Chief Bill Parker (Nick Nolte))
The Glimmer Man (1999 TV Asahi edition) (Donald Cunningham (John M. Jackson))
Guardians of the Galaxy Vol. 2 (Taserface (Chris Sullivan))
Harry Potter and the Deathly Hallows – Part 1 (Death Eater Yaxley (Peter Mullan))
Hearts Beat Loud (Dave (Ted Danson))
Infernal Affairs (Wong Chi-shing (Anthony Wong))
Knockin' on Heaven's Door (Henk (Thierry Van Werveke))
Lock, Stock and Two Smoking Barrels (Big Chris (Vinnie Jones))
The Lone Ranger (Butch Cavendish (William Fichtner))
Mercury Rising (Special Agent Tommy Jordan (Chi McBride))
The Messenger: The Story of Joan of Arc (Jean de Dunois (Tchéky Karyo))
National Security (Nash (Eric Roberts))
Nightmare Alley (Bruno (Ron Perlman))
Nobody (Eddie Williams (Michael Ironside))
Norbit (Big Black Jack Latimore (Terry Crews))
Our Family Wedding (Bradford Boyd (Forest Whitaker))
Pirates of the Caribbean: On Stranger Tides (Gunner (DeObia Oparei))
Platoon (2003 TV Tokyo edition) (Rhah (Francesco Quinn))
Pumpkinhead: Ashes to Ashes (Ed Harley (Lance Henriksen))
The Quiet Man (2017 Star Channel edition) (Squire "Red" Will Danaher (Victor McLaglen))
Rage (Detective St. John (Danny Glover))
Same Kind of Different as Me (Earl Hall (Jon Voight))
SEAL Team 8: Behind Enemy Lines (Ricks (Tom Sizemore))
Seraphim Falls (Hayes (Michael Wincott))
Seven (2001 TV Asahi edition) (District Attorney Martin Talbot (Richard Roundtree))
Shanghai Noon (Marshal Nathan Van Cleef (Xander Berkeley))
Snatch (Bullet Tooth Tony (Vinnie Jones))
Snatch (2017 Blu-Ray edition) (Abraham "Cousin Abe" Denovitz (Dennis Farina))
True Grit ("Lucky" Ned Pepper (Barry Pepper))
The Unknown Woman (Muffa (Michele Placido))
Vehicle 19 (Detective Smith (Gys de Villiers))
Veronica Guerin (John Traynor (Ciarán Hinds))
The Watcher (Hollis (Chris Ellis))

Animation
The Addams Family 2 (Big Bad Ronny)
Batman: The Brave and the Bold (Joe Chill)
The Spectacular Spider-Man (Tombstone)
Spider-Man: The Animated Series (J. Jonah Jameson)
Spider-Man Unlimited (J. Jonah Jameson)
Surf's Up 2: WaveMania (Undertaker)

References

External links
 

Japanese male voice actors
Actors from Fukuoka Prefecture
1951 births
Living people